Daniele Bagnoli (born 25 October 1953 in Mantua, Italy) is an Italian volleyball head coach of Italian club Top Volley Latina. 
As coach, Bagnoli is an eight-time Italian champion, seven-time Italian Cup winner, two-time Winner's Cup winner, five-time European Cup and League of Champions winner, five-time SuperCup of Italy winner and a two-time CEV Cup Winner.
Since 2007, Bagnoli has been the head coach of VC Dynamo Moscow, where he guided the team to titles in the Russian League, the Supercup and the Russian Cup in 2008.
Bagnoli winner five Champions cup in CEV Champions League as coach, Modena (1995–96, 1996–97) and Treviso (1998–1999, 1999–2000, 2005–2006).
Bagnoli named Russia national team head coach 2009–10 and won silver medals at 2010 FIVB Volleyball World League. He to go Asia in 2013 until 2015 and winner Asian Club Championship.

Career
Italy Pallavolo Mantova (1982–85)
Italy Pallavolo Guidizzolo (1985–86)
Italy Polisportiva Virgilio (1986–90)
Italy Italy Assistant Coach (1990–92)
Mediterranean Games: 1991
Italy Galileo Giovolley (1992–93)
Italy Pallavolo Modena (1993–97)
European Super Cup: 1995
CEV Champions League: 1995–96, 1996–97
CEV Cup: 1994–95
Italian Volleyball League: 1994–95, 1996–97
Italian Cup: 1993–94, 1994–95, 1996–97
Italy Roma Volley (1997–98)
Italy Sisley Treviso (1998-00)
European Super Cup: 1999
CEV Champions League: 1998–99, 1999–00
Challenge Cup: 1997–98
Italian Volleyball League: 1997–98, 1998–99
Italian Cup: 1999-00
Italian Super Cup: 1998
Italy Pallavolo Modena (2000–01)	
Italy Sisley Treviso (2001–07)
CEV Champions League: 2005–06
Challenge Cup: 2002–03
Italian Volleyball League: 2002–03, 2003–04, 2004–05, 2006–07
Italian Cup: 2003–2004, 2004–2005, 2006–2007
Italian Super Cup: 2001, 2003, 2004, 2005
Russia Dynamo Moscow (2007–09)
Russian Volleyball Super League: 2008
Russia Russia (2009–10).
Italy Pallavolo Modena (2011–12)
Turkey Fenerbahçe Grundig (2012–13) 
Iran Matin Varamin (2013–2014)
AVC Club Volleyball Championship: 2014
Iranian Volleyball Super League: 2014
Qatar Al Rayan (2014–2015)
Qatari Volleyball League: 2015
Tunisia CS Sfaxien (2016–2016)
Italy Top Volley Latina (2016–2017)
Russia Ural Ufa (2017–2018)
Italy Volley Callipo (2019–)

References

External links
Profile at legavolley.it

1953 births
Living people
Sportspeople from Mantua
Italian volleyball coaches
Coaches of Russia men's national volleyball team

Mediterranean Games gold medalists for Italy
Competitors at the 1991 Mediterranean Games
Mediterranean Games medalists in volleyball